The 19th Huading Awards ceremony was held on May 21, 2016 at Chengdu.

Nominations and winners
Complete list of nominees and winners (denoted in bold)

References

2016 television awards
2016 in Chinese television
Huading Awards